Patrick O'Rourke (1 January 1934  17 January 2011) was an Irish professional footballer who played as an forward in the League of Ireland, most notably for St Patrick's Athletic.

O'Rourke was brought up in the Inchicore neighbourhood of west Dublin and played youth football for local side Bulfin United. In 1953 he signed for League of Ireland outfit St Patrick's Athletic, also located in the Inchicore area. With the Saints, O'Rourke would win two league championships and two FAI Cups. The 1955-56 League season would see O'Rourke and strike partner Shay Gibbons net a combined haul of 38 goals for the Saints.

In 1958, he won two caps for the Ireland B team, one at home against South Africa B and the other away to Iceland. On 12 September 1961, O'Rourke was Pats only goalscorer in a 4-1 loss away to Dunfermline Athletic in the UEFA Cup Winners' Cup.

In January 2011 St Patrick's Athletic announced the death of O'Rourke.

Honours
St Patrick's Athletic
League of Ireland (2): 1954-55, 1955-56
FAI Cup (2): 1958-59, 1960-61

Individual
St Patrick's Athletic Hall of Fame

References

1934 births
2011 deaths
Association football forwards
Association footballers from Dublin (city)
Republic of Ireland association footballers
Association footballers from County Dublin
St Patrick's Athletic F.C. players
Limerick F.C. players